Arse Elektronika is an annual conference organized by the Austrian arts and philosophy collective monochrom, focused on sex and technology. The festival presents talks, workshops, machines, presentations and films. The festival's curator is Johannes Grenzfurthner. Between 2007 and 2015, the event was held in San Francisco, but is now a traveling event in different countries.

The name Arse Elektronika is a pun on Ars Electronica, the name of an arts and technology organization also based in Austria.

Speakers at past conferences have included Violet Blue, Mark Dery, Richard Kadrey, Annalee Newitz, Carol Queen, Susie Bright and Rudy Rucker, with demonstrations by Kyle Machulis of the blog Slashdong; Heather Kelley; Allen Stein of Thrillhammer; and other engineers of the pornographic website Fucking Machines.

Arse Elektronika became a point of reference for many debates around sex and technology.

Main conferences

 2007: The first conference, dealing with the impact of sex on technological innovation and adoption. 
 2008: "Do Androids Sleep with Electric Sheep: Critical Perspectives on Sex and Science Fiction," focused on sex and technology as seen through the futurist lens of science fiction, as well as depictions of science fiction in pornography.
 2009:, "Of Intercourse and Intracourse" dealt with bodies and the modification thereof, including wetware, gene therapy, biotechnology and body modification. Talks also speculated on the social impacts of these technologies, particularly the implications on heteronormativity if biological sex becomes easily changeable.
 2010: "Space Racy", dealt with issues of space, both in an architectural and aeronautical sense. Topics included the possibility of sex in outer space, the gendered and/or sexualized nature of built spaces, interspecies romance in video games, and an interactive installation called Six Feet Under Club in which participants could have sex while buried in a surveillant coffin.
 2011: "Screw the System," dealt with sex, technology, class politics, and culture.
 2012: "4PLAY: Gamifuckation and Its Discontents" dealt with sex, technology and games.
 2013: "id/entity" dealt with sex, technology and identity.
 2014:, "TRANS*.*" dealt with technology and sexuality in societal and personal transition.
 2015: "Shoot Your Workload" dealt with technology and sexuality and work (tech and sex work; work and labour politics in context of sex tech; work in a physical context).
 2023: "Sexponential" deals with artificial intimacy. It will take place in Linz, Austria in September 2023.

Additional exhibitions and performances

Arse Elektronika organizes exhibitions and lecture performances world-wide that are not always part of the actual conference. In April 2010, the first Arse Elektronika exhibition "Techno(sexual) Bodies" was presented at Videotage in the city of Hong Kong; it was curated by Johannes Grenzfurthner and Isaac Leung.

In March 2019, monochrom presented (as part of an Arse Elektronika special at NRW-Forum in Düsseldorf) a sex robot called Nekropneum Fuckenbrust Neckhammer 40k.

Publications
pr0nnovation? Pornography and Technological Innovation (Arse Elektronika Anthology #1)
 Edited by Johannes Grenzfurthner, Günther Friesinger, Daniel Fabry. Published by RE/Search Publications (San Francisco) in cooperation with monochrom.
 Features essays by Michael Achenbach, Timothy Archibald, Peter Asaro, Thomas Ballhausen, Binx, Violet Blue, Jonathan Coopersmith, Mark Dery, Thomas Edlinger, Johannes Grenzfurthner, Ema Konstantinova, Tina Lorenz, Stefan Lutschinger, Kyle Machulis (Slashdong), Aaron Muszalski, Annalee Newitz, Carol Queen, Thomas Roche, Autumn Tyr-Salvia, Frank Apunkt Schneider, Katie Vann, Rose White, Amanda Williams, Katherina Zakravsky.

Do Androids Sleep with Electric Sheep? Critical Perspectives on Sexuality and Pornography in Science and Social Fiction (Arse Elektronika Anthology #2)
 Edited by Johannes Grenzfurthner, Günther Friesinger, Daniel Fabry, Thomas Ballhausen. Published by RE/Search Publications (San Francisco) in cooperation with monochrom.
 Featuring essays and short-stories by Rudy Rucker, Richard Kadrey, James Tiptree, Jr., Allen Stein, Sharing is Sexy, Jason Brown, Cory Doctorow, Annalee Newitz, Tina Lorenz, Reesa Brown, Karin Harrasser, Isaac Leung, Rose White, Mela Mikes, Viviane, Susan Mernit, Chris Noessel, Kit O'Connell, Jens Ohlig, Bonni Rambatan, Thomas Roche, Bonnie Ruberg, Mae Saslaw, Violet Blue, Nathan Shedroff, 23N!, Benjamin Cowden, Johannes Grenzfurthner, Daniel Fabry.

Of Intercourse and Intracourse – Sexuality, Biomodification and the Techno-Social Sphere (Arse Elektronika Anthology #3)
 Edited by Johannes Grenzfurthner, Günther Friesinger, Daniel Fabry. Published by RE/Search Publications (San Francisco) in cooperation with monochrom.
 Featuring essays and short-stories by Eleanor Saitta, R.U. Sirius, Jack Sargeant, Annalee Newitz, Katrien Jacobs, Christian Heller, Bonni Rambatan, Kyle Machulis, Saul Albert, Tatiana Bazzichelli, Johannes Grenzfurthner, Violet Blue, Carol Queen, Douglas Spink, Rose White, Rainer Prohaska, Thomas Ballhausen, Uncle Abdul, Elle Mehrmand (Echolalia Azalee), Micha Cárdenas (Azdel Slade), Ani Niow, Monika Kribusz, Noah Weinstein, Randy Sarafan, Allen Stein, Kim De Vries, Pepper Mint, Robert Glashuettner, Jonathon Keats.

Screw The System – Explorations of Spaces, Games and Politics through Sexuality and Technology (Arse Elektronika Anthology #4)
 Edited by Johannes Grenzfurthner, Günther Friesinger, Daniel Fabry. Published by RE/Search Publications (San Francisco) in cooperation with monochrom.
 Featuring essays and short-stories by Jaakko Stenros, Paolo Pedercini, Rosalynn Rothstein, Adam Rothstein, Jack Sargeant, Anna Anthropy, Heather Kelley, Lindsay Grace, Johannes Grenzfurthner, Maggie Mayhem, Ned Mayhem, Kristen Stubbs, Marco Maiocchi, Margherita Pillan, Marko Radeta, Pietro Righi Riva, Samuel Coniglio, Katherine Becvar, Nadja Sayej, Thomas Ballhausen, Philip Freeman, Jonathan Mann, Rich Gibson, Maymay.

References

External links 

 Arse Elektronika website
 Archive of Past Conferences

Austrian artist groups and collectives
Culture of San Francisco
Monochrom
Recurring events established in 2007
Sexuality and society
Technology conferences
Sexuality and computing
Robotic art
2007 in robotics
Machine sex